This is a glossary of properties and concepts in category theory in mathematics. (see also Outline of category theory.)

Notes on foundations: In many expositions (e.g., Vistoli), the set-theoretic issues are ignored; this means, for instance, that one does not distinguish between small and large categories and that one can arbitrarily form a localization of a category. Like those expositions, this glossary also generally ignores the set-theoretic issues, except when they are relevant (e.g., the discussion on accessibility.)

Especially for higher categories, the concepts from algebraic topology are also used in the category theory. For that see also glossary of algebraic topology.

The notations and the conventions used throughout the article are:
[n] = {0, 1, 2, …, n}, which is viewed as a category (by writing .)
Cat, the category of (small) categories, where the objects are categories (which are small with respect to some universe) and the morphisms functors.
Fct(C, D), the functor category: the category of functors from a category C to a category D.
Set, the category of (small) sets.
sSet, the category of simplicial sets.
"weak" instead of "strict" is given the default status; e.g., "n-category" means "weak n-category", not the strict one, by default.
By an ∞-category, we mean a quasi-category, the most popular model, unless other models are being discussed.
The number zero 0 is a natural number.

A

B

C

D

E

F

G

H

I

K

L

M

N

O

P

Q

R

S

T

U

W

Y

Z

Notes

References

A. Joyal, The theory of quasi-categories II (Volume I is missing??)
Lurie, J., Higher Algebra
Lurie, J., Higher Topos Theory

Further reading 
 Groth, M., A Short Course on ∞-categories
 Cisinski's notes
History of topos theory
http://plato.stanford.edu/entries/category-theory/

Emily Riehl, A leisurely introduction to simplicial sets
 Categorical Logic lecture notes by Steve Awodey
  (a detailed discussion of a 2-category)

Category theory
Wikipedia glossaries using description lists